José Augusto Dlofo (born 18 April 1968), better known as Zé Augusto, is a Mozambican former footballer who played as a defender for Costa do Sol. He made 25 appearances for the Mozambique national team from 1995 to 1998. He was also named in Mozambique's squad for the 1998 African Cup of Nations tournament.

References

External links
 

1968 births
Living people
Mozambican footballers
Association football defenders
Mozambique international footballers
1996 African Cup of Nations players
1998 African Cup of Nations players
CD Costa do Sol players